Bay Kamara is a Dutch-Senegalese player who plays for the Egyptian Premier League side Aswan SC   as a winger

Biography 
Bay Kamara was born on February 15 2001 in Senegal.He started his career with Zeborgia team before joining Netherland International Youth Team.   He has also previously played at AZ Alkmaar and FC Emmen.  He joined the Egyptian Premier League side Aswan SC in 2022 and he is currently on loan to Ismaily SC.

References 

Aswan SC players
Egyptian Premier League players
Ismaily SC players
Egyptian football biography stubs